

Schools and universities in Armenia

Some of universities in Armenia:
American University of Armenia
Yerevan State University
Yerevan State Medical University
Russian-Armenian State University Yerevan, Armenia
Université Française en Arménie Yerevan, Armenia
State Engineering University of Armenia Yerevan, Armenia
Yerevan Physics Institute Yerevan, Armenia
Yerevan State Academy of Fine Arts Yerevan, Armenia
Yerevan State Linguistic University Yerevan, Armenia
National Academy of Sciences of Armenia
Yerevan State Institute of Economy
Armenian State Pedagogical University

Schools outside Armenia

Armenian Elementary Schools
Greece
Zavarian Elementary School , (Nikaia-Pireos, Greece)

Turkey
Ortakoy Tarkmancas Elementary School (Ortakoy, Istanbul, Turkey)
Aramyan Uncuyan Elementary School (Kadikoy, Istanbul, Turkey)
Karagozyan Orphanage for Boys and Elementary School (Sisli, Istanbul, Turkey)
Ferikoy Merametciyan Elementary School (Sisli, Istanbul, Turkey)
Pangalti Mihitaryan Elementary and High School (Sisli, Istanbul, Turkey)
 Bomonti Mihitaryan Elementary School (Sisli, Istanbul, Turkey)
Bezciyan Elementary School (Kumkapi, Istanbul, Turkey)
 Anarad Higutyun Elementary School (Kocamustafapasa, Istanbul, Turkey)
Sahakyan Nunyan Elementary and High School (Kocamustafapasa, Istanbul, Turkey)
 Levon Vartuhyan Elementary School (Topkapi, Istanbul, Turkey)
Dadyan Elementary School (Bakirkoy, Istanbul, Turkey
 Kalfayan Orhanage for Girls and Elementary School (Uskudar, Istanbul, Turkey)
Yesilkoy Armenian Elementary School (Yesilkoy, Istanbul, Turkey)
Esayan Elementary and High School (Beyoglu, Istanbul, Turkey)

Lebanon
 Forty Martyrs National Armenian School (Nor Marash, Bourj Hammoud, Lebanon)
 Aksor Kassarjian School (Ashrafieh, Lebanon)
 AGBU Levon G. Nazarian School Horsh Tabet (Sin El Fil, Lebanon)
 Apkarian School (Nor Adana, Bourj Hammoud, Lebanon)

Middle East
 Sts. Tarkmanchatz Armenian School of Jerusalem 1929 (Jerusalem)
 Sahagian Armenian School of Aleppo (Aleppo, Syria)
 AGBU Gullabi Gulbenkian School (Damascus, Syria)
 Yuzbashian-Gulbenkian Elementary School (Amman, Jordan)
 École Arménienne Catholique Saint Sahag et Saint Mesrob (Amman, Jordan)
 Nubarian Armenian School (Cairo, Egypt)
 AGBU Marie Manoogian School (Tehran, Iran)
 AGBU Nevart Gulbenkian School (Tehran, Iran)
 http://baghdadarmenianschool.com/ Baghdad United Armenian School (Baghdad, Iraq)

United States
Ari Guiragos Minassian Armenian School (Santa Ana, CA)
AGBU Manoogian-Demirdjian School (Canoga Park, CA)
Armenian Mesrobian Elementary & High School (Pico Rivera, CA)
Armenian Sisters Academy (Montrose, CA)
Chamlian Armenian School (Glendale, CA)
Holy Martyrs Armenian Elementary and Ferrahian High School (North Hills, CA)
Krouzian-Zekarian-Vasbouragan Armenian School (San Francisco, CA)
Rose and Alex Pilibos Armenian School (Hollywood, CA)
TCA Arshag Dickranian Armenian School (Hollywood, CA)
Charlie Keyan Armenian Community School (Fresno, CA)
St. Gregory's Alfred & Marguerite Hovsepian School (Pasadena, CA)
Mekhitarist Fathers' Armenian School (Tujunga, CA)
Sahag-Mesrob Armenian Christian School (Altadena, CA)
C & E Merdinian Armenian Evangelical School (Sherman Oaks, CA)
Armenian Sisters Academy (Boston / Lexington, MA)
St. Stephens Armenian Elementary School (Watertown, MA)
St. Illuminator's Armenian Day School (Woodside, NY)
Holy Martyrs Armenian Day School (Bayside, NY)
The Hovnanian School (New Milford, NJ)
Armenian Sisters Academy (Radnor, PA)
AGBU Alex & Marie Manoogian School (Southfield, MI)
 Taniel Varoujan Armenian School (Glenview, IL)

Canada
École Arménienne Sourp Hagop (Montreal, Quebec, Canada)
AGBU École Alex Manoogian (Montreal, Quebec, Canada)
 École Notre-Dame-de-Nareg (Laval, Quebec, Canada)
A.R.S. Kololian Armenian School (Toronto, Ontario, Canada)
AGBU Zaroukian School (Toronto, Ontario, Canada)

Europe
École Barsamian (Nice, France)
Collège Privé Hamaskaïne (Marseilles, France]
École Franco-Arménienne Tebrotzassere (Le Raincy, France)
 École Arménienne Markarian-Papazian (Lyon, France)
 École Arménienne Tarkmanchatz (Issy-les-Moulineaux, France)
 École Notre-Dame-du-Sacré-Coeur (Marseille, France)
 École Saint Mesrob (Alfortville, France)
École Bilingue Hrant Dink (Arnouville-lès-Gonesse, France)
 AGBU Artaki Kalpakian School (Athens, Greece)

Latin America
 Escuela Armenia Sahag Mesrob (Cordoba, Argentina)
AGBU Instituto Marie Manoogian (Buenos Aires, Argentina)
Colegio Armenio de Vicente López (Buenos Aires, Argentina)
 Escuela Armenio Argentina N°8 D.E. 9 (Buenos Aires) Public School, named by law in 1968
Colegio Mekhitarista (Buenos Aires, Argentina)
 Instituto Isaac Backchellian (Buenos Aires, Argentina)
Instituto Educativo San Gregorio El Iluminador (Buenos Aires, Argentina)
 Colegio Arzruní (Buenos Aires, Argentina)
 Colegio Armenio Jrimian ( Valentin Alsina, Buenos Aires, Argentina)
AGBU Colegio Nubarian (Montevideo, Uruguay)
 Instituto Educacional Nersesian (Montevideo, Uruguay)
 Esc N° 156 “Armenia” (Montevideo, Uruguay) Public School, named by law in 1965
 Esc N° 16 “República de Armenia” (Salto, Uruguay) Public School, named by law in 1998
 AGBU Paren and Regina Bazarian School (São Paulo, Brazil)
 Pré-escola Gregório Mavian (São Paulo, Brazil)

Australia
AGBU Alexander Primary School (Sydney, NSW, Australia)
Galstaun College (Ingleside, NSW, Australia)
St. Gregory's Armenian School (Beaumont Hills, NSW, Australia)

India
Armenian College and Philanthropic Academy

Armenian Intermediate Schools
 Sahakian Levon Meguerditchian College (Sin el Fil, Lebanon)
 AGBU Boghos K. Garmirian School (Antelias, Lebanon)
Armenian Evangelical Peter and Elizabeth Torosian School (Amanos, Lebanon)
Armenian National Haratch-Gulbengian School (Ainjar, Lebanon)
AGBU Alex & Marie Manoogian School (Southfield, MI)
AGBU Manoogian-Demirdjian School (Canoga Park, CA)
Armenian Mesrobian Elementary & High School (Pico Rivera, CA)
Armenian Sisters Academy (Montrose, CA)
Armenian Sisters Academy (Radnor, PA)
Armenian Sisters Academy (Boston / Lexington, MA)
Chamlian Armenian School (Glendale, CA)
Holy Martyrs Armenian Elementary and Ferrahian High School (Encino, CA)
Krouzian-Zekarian-Vasbouragan Armenian School (San Francisco, CA)
Rose and Alex Pilibos Armenian School (Hollywood, CA)
TCA Arshag Dickranian Armenian School (Hollywood, CA)
Collège Privé Hamaskaïne (Marseilles, France]
École Franco-Arménienne Tebrotzassere (Le Raincy, France)
St. Gregory's Armenian School (Beaumont Hills, NSW, Australia)
Mekhitarist Fathers' Armenian School (Tujunga, CA)
Sahag-Mesrob Armenian Christian School (Pasadena, CA)
C & E Merdinian Evangelical School (Sherman Oaks, CA)
Armenian College and Philanthropic Academy (Kolkata, India)

Armenian High Schools
Armenian Evangelical Central High School (Ashrafieh, Lebanon)
Yeprem and Martha Philibosian Armenian Evangelical College (Beirut, Lebanon)
Armenian Evangelical Secondary School of Anjar (Anjar, Lebanon)
Sahakian Levon Meguerditchian College (Sin el Fil, Lebanon)
Sts. Tarkmanchatz Armenian School of Jerusalem 1929 (Jerusalem)
Levon & Sophia Hagopian Armenian National College (Bourj Hamoud, Beirut-Lebanon)
Caloust Gulbengian Armenian National College(Ainjar, Lebanon)
AGBU Alex & Marie Manoogian School (Southfield, MI)
AGBU The Lazar Najarian - Calouste Gulbenkian Armenian Central High School (Aleppo, Syria)
AGBU Manoogian-Demirdjian School (Canoga Park, CA)
AGBU Instituto Marie Manoogian (Buenos Aires, Argentina)
 AGBU Tarouhi-Hovagimian Secondary School Horsh Tabet (Sin El Fil, Lebanon)
AGBU Vatche and Tamar Manoukian High School (Pasadena, CA)
Armenian Catholic Mesrobian High School & Technical College (Bourj Hammoud, Lebanon)
Armenian Mesrobian Elementary & High School (Pico Rivera, CA)
Holy Martyrs Armenian Elementary and Ferrahian High School (Encino, CA)
Rose and Alex Pilibos Armenian School (Hollywood, CA)
TCA Arshag Dickranian Armenian School (Hollywood, CA)
 Hay Azkayin Turian Varjaran - Externato José Bonifácio (São Paulo, Brazil)
Melkonian Educational Institute (Cyprus)
Armenian Evangelical Shamlian Tatikian School (Bourj Hammoud, Lebanon)
Armenian Evangelical Central High School (Ashrafieh, Lebanon)
Armenian Evangelical College (Beirut, Lebanon)
Armenian Evangelical Secondary School Anjar (Anjar, Lebanon)
École Arménienne Sourp Hagop (Montreal, Quebec, Canada)
Collège Privé Hamaskaïne (Marseilles, France]
Hamazkaine Arshak & Sophie Galstaun School (Ingleside, NSW, Australia)
Djemaran (Beirut, Lebanon)
Lycée Nevarte Gulbenkian (Le Raincy, France)
Getronagan Armenian High School (Karaköy/Istanbul, Turkey)
Surp Hac High School (Uskudar, Istanbul, Turkey)
 Colegio Jrimian (Buenos Aires, Argentina)http://jrimian.edu.ar/
Instituto Privado Terizakian (Buenos Aires, Argentina)
Colegio Mekhitarista (Buenos Aires, Argentina)
 Colegio Arzruní (Buenos Aires, Argentina)
 Alishan School (Tehran, Iran)
Armenian College (Calcutta, India)
Sahag-Mesrob Armenian Christian School (Pasadena, CA)
Karen Jeppe Gemaran (Aleppo, Syria)
Yeghishe Manoukian College (Dbayyeh, Lebanon)
Melankton & Haig Arslanian Djemaran (Mezher, Lebanon)

Armenian Colleges and Universities
Haigazian University (Beirut, Lebanon)
Mashdots College (Glendale, CA)

Virtual Schools
Armenian Virtual College of AGBU

Armenian Studies Programs

Armenian Research Center University of Michigan - Dearborn, Dearborn, MI
Armenian Studies UCLA
Armenian Studies Harvard University
Armenian Studies Program California State University, Fresno
Armenian Studies Hebrew University, Jerusalem, Israel
Armenian University of Oxford, U.K.
Armenian Studies Program U.C. Berkeley
Armenian Language and Culture Summer Intensive Course Ca' Foscari University of Venice, Venice, Italy
USC Institute of Armenian Studies Los Angeles, California
Section d'arménien de l'Université de Provence à Aix-en-Provence Aix-en-Provence, France
Études Arméniennes Université de Genève, Geneva, Switzerland
Arménien Institut National des Langues et Civilisations Orientales (INALCO) Paris, France
Armenian Studies Courses Glendale Community College, Glendale, California
Charles K. and Elisabeth M. Kenosian Professor in Modern Armenian History and Literature Boston University

Armenian